The Legend of Leonora is a play by J. M. Barrie.  It was featured on Broadway at the Empire Theatre in January 1914 and starred Maude Adams, running for 136 performances.  The play first appeared briefly in London in September 1913 under the title The Adored One.

Grace George played Leonora in a 1927 revival of the play at the Ritz Theatre that ran for 16 performances.

Original Broadway cast
Mr. Justice Grimdyke by Arthur Lewis
Sir Roderick Peripety by Morton Selten
Captain Rattry, R.N. by Aubrey Smith
Mr. Tovey by Fred Tyler
Mr. Lebetter by R. Peyton Carter
Railway Guard by Byron Silvers
Foreman of Jury by Arthur Fitzgerald
Juryman by Wallace Jackson
Juryman by James L. Carhart
Messenger by Edwin Wilson
Clerk by William Barton
Usher by Stafford Windsor
Policeman by George B. Hubbard
Leonora by Maude Adams
Lady Peripety by Elise Clarens
Mrs. Tovey by Leonora Chippendale
Maid by Mary Murray

References

Plays by J. M. Barrie
1914 plays
Broadway plays
West End plays